The BT Voyager series is a series of ADSL modems supplied by British Telecommunications plc. Several models include WiFi, routing and voice over IP capabilities.

References 

Modems
BT Group